Gimcheon (Gumi) station is a Korea Train Express station on the Gyeongbu KTX Line in Gimcheon City, North Gyeongsang Province, servicing Gimcheon and the nearby industrial center of Gumi. Services began on November 1, 2010. Only select KTX trains stop at Gimcheon (Gumi).

References 

Railway stations in North Gyeongsang Province
Korea Train Express stations
Railway stations opened in 2010